Constantine Clement (born 6 October 1994) is a Malaysian male weightlifter, competing in the 69 kg category and representing Malaysia at international competitions. He competed at world championships, most recently at the 2014 World Weightlifting Championships.

Major results

References

External links
 
 

1994 births
Living people
People from Sabah
Malaysian male weightlifters
Weightlifters at the 2014 Commonwealth Games
Commonwealth Games competitors for Malaysia
21st-century Malaysian people